Ubigeo is the coding system for geographical locations (Spanish: Código Ubicacíon Geográfica) in Peru used by the National Statistics and Computing Institute (Spanish: Instituto Nacional de Estadística e Informática INEI) to code the first-level administrative subdivision: regions (Spanish: regiones, singular: región), the second-level administrative subdivision: provinces (Spanish: provincias, singular: provincia) and the third-level administrative subdivision: districts (Spanish: distritos, singular: distrito). There are 1874 different ubigeos in Peru.

Syntax
The coding system uses two-digit numbers for each level of subdivision. The first level starts numbering at 01 for the Amazonas Region and continues in alphabetical order up to 25 for the Ucayali Region. Additional regions will be added to the end of the list, starting with the first available number. 

The second level starts with 0101 for the first province in the Amazonas region: Chachapoyas Province and continues up to 2504 for the last province Purús in the Ucayali Region. The provinces are numbered per region with the first province always being the one in which the regions capital is located. The remaining provinces are coded in alphabetical order. Additional provinces will be added per region to the end of the list, starting with the first available province number.

The third level; starts with 010101 for the first district in the first province in the Amazonas region: Chachapoyas District and continues up to 250401 for the last district in the last province of the Ucayali region: Purús District. The districts are numbered per province with the first district always being the one in which the province’ capital is located. The remaining districts are coded in alphabetical order. Additional districts will be added per province to the end of the list, starting with the first available district number.

Examples

Regions
01 Amazonas Region
02 Ancash Region
03 Apurímac Region

Provinces
0101 Chachapoyas Province in the Amazonas region.
0102 Bagua Province in the Amazonas region.
0103 Bongará Province in the Amazonas region.
0104 Condorcanqui Province in the Amazonas region.
0105 Luya Province in the Amazonas region.
0106 Rodríguez de Mendoza Province in the Amazonas region.
0107 Utcubamba Province in the Amazonas region.
0201 Huaraz Province in the Ancash region.

Districts
010101 Chachapoyas District in the Chachapoyas province.
010102 Asunción District in the Chachapoyas province.
010103 Balsas District in the Chachapoyas province.
010104 Cheto District in the Chachapoyas province.
010105 Chiliquín District in the Chachapoyas province.

Recent additions

See also
 Census in Peru

References

External links
 INEI website

Geocodes
Geography of Peru